
The Schwechat is a river in Lower Austria.

River course
The source is near the Schöpfl (893 m) in the Vienna Woods. The source streams are the Riesenbach, Lammeraubach, Agsbach, Hainbach and the Großkrottenbach, which merge at Klausen-Leopoldsdorf to form the Schwechat. It flows through the small town of Alland, through the Helenental to Baden, and through the Vienna Basin to Schwechat, where the river flows into in the Danube.

Helenental
Originally gothic, it has since been replaced by a baroque structure.

References

Citations

Bibliography
 .

External links

Rivers of Lower Austria
Rivers of Austria